List of airports in Ankara, this is a list of airports in the capital of Turkey of Ankara.



List of airports
The list is sorted by the name of the community served, click the sort buttons in the table header to switch listing order.

See also
List of airports in Turkey

 
Airports
Ankara